Mama Bhagne is a 2009 Bengali film directed by Anup Sengupta and produced by Ishika Films Pvt. Ltd And Sujay Entertainment Digital Pvt.Ltd . under the banner of  Ishika Films Pvt. Ltd And Sujay Entertainment Digital Pvt.Ltd The film features actors Prosenjit Chatterjee and Ranjit Mallick and Ananya Chatterjee in the lead roles. Music of the film has been composed by Subhayu Bedajna. It's a Unofficial remake Hindi Movie Rajaji

Cast 
 Prosenjit Chatterjee as a Raja
 Ranjit Mallick as a Raja's Maternal Uncle
 Ananya Chatterjee as Payel
  Arpita Mukherjee as Payel Friend
 Biswajit Chakraborty as Payel's Father
 Raja Chattopadhyay as G.P.(Govinda Purakaysto)
 Shankar Chakraborty

References 

Bengali-language Indian films
2009 films
2000s Bengali-language films
Films directed by Anup Sengupta